Brown Morning is a French fable, written by Franck Pavloff in 1998, published by a publishing house usually specialized in poetry, editions Cheyne in December 1998.

The title of the fable refers to the "Brown Shirts" nickname given to Nazi SA militia. The author wrote this news as a "fit of anger" after the revelation of candidates alliances with the National Front in the second round of elections

Brown Morning is a new universal against the single thought and what Pavloff called "small compromissions". This book has a universal appeal because the space-time indications are not detailed. The book has been very successful in 2002 (more than a million copies sold) after the surprise of the first round of the presidential election in which the far-right candidate Jean-Marie Le Pen was qualified for the second round. Since this news is regularly the subject of discussions and work in schools.

Summary
The State Brun, fictitious political organization, prohibits the possession of dogs or cats which are not brown, ostensibly for scientific reasons. The protagonists of the story, not feeling concerned, find reasons to approve this law. However, a new decree requires the arrest of all those who have not a brown animal in the past, as well as their families and friends.

Similarities
Its theme and progression of its plot are similar to those of Ich habe geschwiegen poem using anaphora, wrote in Dachau by Pastor Martin Niemöller (text reviewed by Bertolt Brecht).

The theme of brown Morning is also very close to that of the playwright Eugène Ionesco has developed in his play Rhinoceros.

Adaptations
Vincent Josse have developed a CD-book edited by Night in 2002, played by Jacques Bonnaffé and Denis Podalydès, with music by Christian Zanési (from affected areas) and Bruno Letort (from electronic Fables) and cover illustrated by Enki Bilal.

The director Serge Avedikian adapted Brown Morning for his animated short one morning. Shot in 35 mm and released in 2005, this film is made from paintings Solweig Von Kleist, a German painter living in Paris. He has traveled the world in more than 40 festivals, won numerous awards and is being studied as part of the initiative College at Cinema in France. The Arte channel, co-producer of the film, was broadcast several times.

The composer Bruno Giner wrote in the book pocket opera called Charlie and performed by the Ensemble Aleph, published in CD-book form by the collection "Signatures" of Radio France in 2007 with coverage of Enki Bilal.

Psysalia Psysalis Psyche, group of Japanese post-rock, achieved in 2009 its first album named Brown Morning in reference to the literary work. This album is a nod to an illustrated version of the new Franck Pavloff.

Hong Kong cartoonist Ah To adapted Brown Morning into a comic book about Hong Kong's political situation in 2015.

References

External links 
 Entretien de Franck Pavloff et Bruno Giner sur Matin Brun et Charlie
 Le « phénomène Matin brun »,  éditions Cheyne
 Matin brun, Audio version, downloadable mp3, free of charge

1998 books
Anti-fascist books